Punjkot is a tehsil (administrative subdivision of local government) in Muzaffarabad, Azad Kashmir, Pakistan.

Populated places in Muzaffarabad District